Huntington University is an independent university located in Greater Sudbury, Ontario, Canada. Formerly a federated college of Laurentian University, the institution announced plans in 2021 to continue as an independent institution following the termination of its federation agreement with Laurentian in 2021.

The Huntington University building overlooks much of Sudbury's campus community which includes three other local post-secondary institutions:  Laurentian University, Thorneloe University and University of Sudbury.  

The Huntington University residence provides co-ed accommodation for 130+ students.

Affiliations
A growing university, Huntington has proudly partnered with many organizations, both national and international, creating affiliations and affinities, including a long-standing and respected partnership with the United Church of Canada.

Governance
The university is governed by a board of regents chaired by Mrs. Mary-Liz Warwick. The current president and vice-chancellor of Huntington University is Dr. Kevin McCormick.
There have been five chancellors on the board of regents in Huntington University's history. Theodore K. Jewell from 1999-2005, Rev. Murray C. Arnell from 2005-2007, Dr. Edward J. Conroy from 2007-2014 / 2014-2016 (Chancellor Emeritus), Ms. Patricia Ann Mills (2016-2018), and presently Mrs. Bela Ravi.

History
The university was founded in 1960 as one of the first post-secondary establishments of northern Ontario.

Centres of Excellence 
Huntington University has established numerous centres of excellence, including the Peruvian Canadian Institute, Canadian Finnish Institute, Lougheed Teaching and Learning Centre, Canadian Institute for Studies in Aging, Centre for Communication Studies, and the Centre for Religion, Spirituality and Ritual Studies.

J.W. Tate Library 
Located within Huntington University is the J.W. Tate Library. The J.W. Tate Library at Huntington University features a specialized collection of books, videos, fine art slides as well as print and electronic journal and reference subscriptions. Also, an assortment of films and educational videos can also be found. In the fall of 2010 the J.W. Tate Library in partnership with the Lougheed Teaching and Learning Centre launched a new student space featuring upgrades in information technology and updated resources for research. Wireless Internet access is available in the library's reading room.

Residence 
The Huntington University Residence provides co-ed accommodation for 130+ students in a mix of double rooms, single rooms and double/single rooms. All of the rooms are wired for free broadband Internet access and available Bell phone lines. There are also four shared kitchens, four common rooms, an exercise room with weight machines and treadmills and a games room.

The Huntington University Residence is staffed by a Residence Supervisor and four Proctors, one for each floor who are upper year students and live in the residence during the school year.

Financial Aid 
Huntington University Residence offers scholarships and bursaries annually to its students ranging from $500-$1,500.

References

External links

 

Education in Greater Sudbury
Educational institutions established in 1960
Buildings and structures in Greater Sudbury
1960 establishments in Ontario